Amhi Jaato Amucha Gava is a Marathi language film released on 9 August 1968. The film was remade in Tamil as Moondru Deivangal and in Hindi as Teen Chor.

Cast 

 Uma Bhende as Vaijayanti
 Suryakant Mandhare, Dhumal, and Ganesh Solanki as criminals - Santaji, Dhanaji and Sayaji
 Madhu Apte as  Khapartonde's mentally challenged son
 Shrikant Moghe as Vaijayanti's future husband

Soundtrack
The music has been directed by Sudhir Phadke.

Track listing

References

External links 
 
 Movie Review - doctorflix.com
  Movie Songs - saregama.com

1968 films
1960s Marathi-language films
Marathi films remade in other languages